John Almond may refer to:

John Almond (monk) (1537–1585), British Cistercian monk
John Almond (martyr) (c. 1577–1612), British saint; one of the Forty Martyrs of England and Wales
John Almond (Archdeacon of Montreal) (1871–1939), Canadian Anglican priest
John Almond (footballer) (1915–1993), British footballer who played for Stoke City and Tranmere Rovers
Jack Almond (1871-?), British footballer
Johnny Almond (1946–2009), British flautist-saxophonist, member of Mark-Almond